"A Tear Fell" is a popular song. It was written by Eugene Randolph and Dorian Burton and released in 1956.

The best-known version of the song was recorded by Teresa Brewer the same year, peaking at number two in the U.K. and #5 in the U.S.  The B-side to her single, "Bo Weevil", was also a hit in the U.S. reaching #17 on the pop chart.

Cover versions 
"A Tear Fell" was recorded in the United Kingdom by Jill Day and Edna Savage. 
The song was also covered by the country singer Billy "Crash" Craddock, and became a top ten country hit. The * It covered by the Jamaican reggae singer, Eric Donaldson.
Ivory Joe Hunter also recorded "A Tear Fell" on 19 November 1955 in New York City, reaching number 15 on the American Billboard R&B chart in March 1956. Ray Charles sang "A Tear Fell", his version entered Cashbox Magazine on July 18, 1964.
Soul singer Solomon Burke recorded "A Tear Fell" in 1966, releasing the song as a 'B' side to his Christmas single "Presents For Christmas" on Atlantic Records.

References 

Teresa Brewer songs
Billy "Crash" Craddock songs
1956 songs